Kayrat Kochkorbaevich Izakov (born 8 June 1997) is a Kyrgyzstani footballer who plays for Abdysh-Ata Kant in the Kyrgyzstan League and Kyrgyzstan national football team as a defender.

Career statistics

International

Statistics accurate as of match played 11 November 2021

References

External links

1997 births
Living people
Kyrgyzstan international footballers
Kyrgyzstani footballers
Association football defenders
FC Abdysh-Ata Kant players